David Ferry may refer to:
 David Ferry (actor) (born 1951), Canadian-born actor
 David Ferry (poet) (born 1924), American poet and translator
 David K. Ferry (born 1940), professor of electrical engineering

See also 
David Ferrie (1918–1967), pilot